NA-244 Karachi West-I is a constituency for the National Assembly of Pakistan.

Area
This constituency includes following Karachi neighborhoods: Surjani Town, Taiser Town, Qalandarani Goth, Abdullah Goth, Gulshan-e-Maymar, Mominabad, Gulshan-e-Tauheed, Manghopir, Ghazi Goth, Hazratabad, Ittehad Town, KDA Flats, etc.

Members of Parliament

2018-2023: NA-252 Karachi West-V

Election 2002 

General elections were held on 10 Oct 2002. Sultan Ahmed Khan of Muttahida Qaumi Movement won by 62,245 votes.

Election 2008 

General elections were held on 18 Feb 2008. Abdul Waseem of Muttahida Qaumi Movement won by 167,764 votes.

Election 2013 

General elections were held on 11 May 2013. Abdul Waseem of Muttahida Qaumi Movement won by 192,638 votes and became the member of National Assembly.

Election 2018 

General elections were held on 25 July 2018.

By-election 2023 
A by-election will be held on 16 March 2023 due to the resignation of Aftab Jehangir, the previous MNA from this seat.

See also
NA-243 Karachi Keamari-II
NA-245 Karachi West-II

References

External links 
Election result's official website

NA-243
Karachi